The 1993 Miami Hurricanes football team represented the University of Miami during the 1993 NCAA Division I-A football season. It was the Hurricanes' 68th season of football and third as a member of the Big East Conference. The Hurricanes were led by fifth-year head coach Dennis Erickson and played their home games at the Orange Bowl. They finished the season 9–3 overall and 6–1 in the Big East to finish in second place. They were invited to the Fiesta Bowl where they lost to Arizona, 29-0.

Schedule

Roster

Rankings

Game summaries

at Florida State

Syracuse

vs. Arizona (Fiesta Bowl)

Awards and honors

Jack Harding University of Miami MVP Award
Kevin Patrick, DE

1994 NFL Draft

References

Miami
Miami Hurricanes football seasons
Miami Hurricanes football